The PZL Bielsko SZD-55 Nexus is a Standard Class sailplane produced by PZL Bielsko since 1988.  It was built in direct competition with the Schempp-Hirth Discus. The SZD-55 is still in production with approximately 110 built.

Design and development
The SZD-55 is built of fiberglass and has an elliptical wing. It has top surface Schempp-Hirth type airbrakes. The glider is reported to have pleasant handling  and to be easy to assemble, with automatic control hookups. With an empty weight of about 215 kg, it is the lightest of the current standard class gliders and it's known for its excellent climbing and thermalling characteristics.  The SZD-55 has a cambered wing-section and performs well at lower speeds, yet when full with water ballast (it can take up to 200 liters) it is also suitable for higher cruising speeds.

The main designer of the SZD-55 was Tadeusz Łabuć. Since the mid-eighties, the best glider in the standard class was undoubtedly the German standard Discus, whose excellent performance was attributed to its unusual triple trapeze wing shape. So it was the logical step to adopt a similar idea for use as the outline of the new construction: the elliptical contour of the wing leading edge. In 1987 construction of the two prototypes started, factory numbers X-144 (SP-P501) and X-145 (SP-P502). They first flew on 15.08.1988 and on 03.01.1989 piloted by January Roman.

Despite enormous difficulties in obtaining advanced materials (carbon fabric, kevlar) which meant that the glider had to be built with glass-epoxy laminates (already a relatively old technology at the time) the manufacturer managed to create a glider with an unladen weight of just over 200 kg. This meant that the PZL Bielsko factory constructed a glider that was lighter than the ones constructed using modern materials(carbon fiber and Kevlar), thanks to innovative construction techniques. This technology was further improved during the designing and building of the SZD-56 Diana.

Specifications

See also

References

 Allstar SZD, the manufacturer of the SZD-55
 US Dealer of SZD Sailplanes
 SZD-55 on sailplanedirectory.com
 SZD-55 Flight Test Evaluation by Richard Johnson

1980s Polish sailplanes
SZD55
SZD aircraft
Aircraft first flown in 1988